The Mental Disability Advocacy Center (MDAC) is an international human rights organisation founded in Hungary in 2002. It is headquartered in Budapest.

Description
The Mental Disability Advocacy Center (MDAC) is an international human rights organisation which advances the rights of children and adults with learning, intellectual and psycho-social (mental health) disabilities.

MDAC uses the law to promote equality and social inclusion through strategic litigation, advocacy, research and monitoring and capacity-building.
 
MDAC operates at the global level as well as regional and domestic levels in Europe and Africa.

History
MDAC was founded by The Open Society Foundations (OSF) and was registered as a foundation by the Budapest Capital Court (registration number 8689) in November 2002. MDAC has participatory status with the Council of Europe, and was granted a special consultative status with the United Nations Economic and Social Council in 2011. MDAC is a member of the Fundamental Rights Platform of the  European Union Agency for Fundamental Rights.

Chairs of the Board: 
April 2015- : Phillippa Kaufmann QC Vice Chair Peter Chivers.

March 2011-March 2014: Dr Felicity Callard.

Up to March 2011: Prof Peter Bartlett.

Beneficiaries
People with learning, intellectual and psycho-social (mental health) disabilities are excluded from economic, civil, social and political rights, including the right to education, health and to vote. They are also denied their personhood under the law, and can be placed in institutions against their will.

Objectives
MDAC's objectives focus on the rights of people with intellectual, learning and psycho-social (mental health) disabilities to be free from abuse, be persons recognised by the law and have access to justice, to live in the community, be educated and to take part in society.

- freedom from ill-treatment: for people with disabilities to be not secluded from the rest of society nor be subjected to physical and chemical restraints, and to be treated only with their consent.

- legal capacity: for people with disabilities to have their right to make their own choices protected by law.

- community living: for people with disabilities to have a legal right to live in the community, and a legally enforceable choice as to where and with whom to live.

- inclusive education: for children, youth and adults with disabilities to have a legal right to be educated and learn alongside the rest of the community, and not be segregated.

- political participation: for people with disabilities to have the right to vote and stand for election, and be assisted in doing so.

Activities
These include creating progressive jurisprudence and law reform, empowering people with disabilities and promoting participatory politics, supported by research.

- defending disabled people’s rights in courts across Europe and Africa, setting precedent at European Court of Human Rights and other courts, training lawyers and providing legal advice and representation.

- advocacy by connecting with governments to reform and implement legal structures, undertaking a watchdog role, reviewing the actions of the UN and the EU as well as governments, and monitoring bodies, so that torture and ill-treatment is prevented.

- working at grassroots level to engage, empower and train people with disabilities to participate in acquiring their own rights.

- research of human rights abuses

Achievements
Since 2002, MDAC has achieved the following:

- ending the practice of caged beds: in 2003, MDAC carried out research in the Czech Republic, Hungary, Slovakia and Slovenia on those countries’ use of cage beds. Cage beds are a means of confinement and restraint for adults and children used within many mental health and social institutions. As a direct result of MDAC’s work, Hungary has banned their use in all institutions, the Czech Republic and Slovakia has banned their use in social care institutions. Very few, if any, are still used in Slovenia.

- creating progressive human rights jurisprudence: MDAC has won cases at the European Court of Human Rights which has opened the way to further challenges to political and social attitudes to the care of people with intellectual and psycho-social disabilities. As a result, it has lobbied for reform of laws on guardianship and the right to be legally recognised as a person in Central and Eastern Europe and Russia. Stanev v Bulgaria (2012), concerned the long-term placement, torture and ill-treatment of a man diagnosed with a mental illness in a remote care institution by his guardian. He had no recourse to legally challenge the decision in Bulgarian courts. This was the first time the Court found a violation of Article 3 of the European Convention on Human Rights (prohibition of torture) in a disability case. It was also the first time the court found that a person in a social care institution was unlawfully detained. Shtukaturov v Russia (2008), concerned the detention of a man diagnosed with schizophrenia. He was placed under guardianship without being informed of the decision. His guardian unlawfully allowed for his detention in a psychiatric hospital for seven months without a court review, and he was forcibly injected with psychiatric medication against his will. MDAC took his case to the European Court of Human Rights and he won.

- the right to education: in 2008, MDAC won an international case under the European Social Charter (MDAC v. Bulgaria) on behalf of up to 3,000 Bulgarian children with intellectual disabilities — the first case on a child’s right to education in Eastern Europe.

- the right to vote: MDAC's ‘Save the Vote’ campaign resulted in the Venice Commission, a constitutional law expert group, supporting universal suffrage for people with disabilities.

- in 2013, MDAC was long-listed for the Václav Havel Human Rights Prize.

- In 2014, MDAC released a report on cage beds in the Czech Republic, after its ground-breaking first report published in 2003. This was covered by Lancet Psychiatry.

See also
Disability rights movement
Disability
List of disability rights organizations

References

External links
Mental Disability Advocacy Center
Text of the Convention
List of the parties
Committee on the Rights of Persons with Disabilities

Medical and health organisations based in Hungary
Disability rights organizations
Organizations established in 2002
2002 establishments in Hungary